Juan Carlos Pita Alvariza (born 1951 in Montevideo) is a Uruguayan physician, politician and diplomat.

Background and earlier life
Pita graduated as a doctor from the Faculty of Medicine of the University of the Republic. At the age of 17 he started his political affiliation in the National Party supporting Wilson Ferreira Aldunate. He was strongly against the civic-military dictatorship and formed the Popular Nationalistic Current during those years.

Political career 
In 1984, he was elected deputy for Montevideo as part of the For the Fatherland movement.

in 1987 he joined the Broad Front.

He was a representative from 1985 to 2005.

He was appointed Uruguayan ambassador to Chile. Later he was appointed as Uruguayan ambassador to Spain.

Ambassador
In 2012 he was appointed ambassador of Uruguay to the United States.

Family life 
He was married to Alicia Magnou and had three daughters with her: Libertad, Ana Laura and Patricia. He was divorced and then married Mariella Mora, with whom he had a fourth daughter, Josefina.

See also
 United States–Uruguay relations

References

External links

1951 births
Physicians from Montevideo
20th-century Uruguayan physicians
Uruguayan politicians
Uruguayan diplomats
Ambassadors of Uruguay to Chile
Ambassadors of Uruguay to Spain
Ambassadors of Uruguay to the United States
Living people